12 is the twelfth studio album by Canadian rock band Sloan. The album debuted at #11 on the Billboard Heatseekers chart,  which is the band's highest position on that chart in their history.

Track listing

Charts

References

2018 albums
Sloan (band) albums
Yep Roc Records albums
Murderecords albums